Tommy Lee is an American heavy metal drummer for the band Mötley Crüe and the ex-husband of Pamela Anderson.

Tommy Lee may also refer to:
Tommy Lee (footballer) (born 1986), English footballer
Tommy Lee (rugby league) (born 1988), English rugby league player
Tommy Lee (gridiron football) (born 1941), American former football player and coach
"Tommy Lee" (song), a song by American rapper Tyla Yaweh featuring Post Malone

See also
Thomas Lee (disambiguation)
Tom Lee (disambiguation)